Steve Smooth is an American EDM/house DJ,  musician, record producer and remixer. He is known for having 15 + number one songs / remixes on the Billboard Dance Club Songs chart. He has done remixes for artists such as Janet Jackson, Ariana Grande, Martin Garrix, Kygo, Enrique Iglesias, Daddy Yankee, Diana Ross, Macklemore & Patrick Stump of Fall Out Boy. As an artist, his Dirty Werk singles with DJ Bam Bam titled "Stand Up" & their electro dance cover of "No Letting Go" both went #1 on the Billboard Dance Club Songs chart in 2018 & 2019. Steve has had releases on such labels as Ultra Records, Ministry of Sound, Black Hole Recordings, Flamingo Recordings & Spinnin Records. Steve is credited for having the first song ever sold on Beatport. Steve is also the official DJ for the Chicago Cubs & Chicago Blackhawks.

Discography

Albums 
 Late Nights (Menage Music)
 Alive (Menage Music / Black Hole Recordings)
 Higher (Ultra Records)
 Amp'd (with JJ Flores) (Ultra Records / Menage Music)
 The Collection (with JJ Flores) (Menage Music)

Singles and remixes 
Aaron Smith ft. Luvli - Dancin (Dirty Werk Remix) - Add. Production and Remix

Dirty Werk - Oh Yeah - Wrote & Produced

Dirty Werk - Stereo Life - Wrote & Produced

Jasmine Crow - Sky Is Falling (Dirty Werk Remix) - Add. Production and Remix

Kea - I Turn To You (Dirty Werk Remix) - Add. Production and Remix

Ximxia - Get Me On The Dance Floor (Dirty Werk Remix) - Add. Production and Remix

Martin Garrix & Dean Lewis - Used To Love (Dirty Werk Remix) - Add. Production and Remix

Ladi Rosato - Taylor Swift (Dirty Werk Remix) - Add. Production and Remix

The Perry Twins - Impluse (Dirty Werk Remix) - Add. Production and Remix

Debbie Gibson - Girls Night Out (Dirty Werk Remix) - Add. Production and Remix

Kesha - Raising Hell ft. Big Freedia (Dirty Werk Remix) - Add. Production and Remix

Brett O & Debby Holiday - Living for the Music (Dirty Werk Remix) - Add. Production and Remix

Hillary Roberts - Christmas With U (Dirty Werk Remix) - Add. Production and Remix

Ray Rhodes & Christian B featuring Meiko - In Another Life (Dirty Werk Remix) - Add. Production and Remix

Valerie Broussard & Galantis - Roots (Dirty Werk Remix) - Add. Production and Remix

Kalendr X Laura Bryna - Sweet Revenge (Dirty Werk Remix) - Add. Production and Remix

Kendra Erika - Break The Wheel (Dirty Werk Remix) - Add. Production and Remix

Mark Ronson ft. Camila Cabello - Find U Again (Dirty Werk Remix) - Add. Production and Remix

Heather Small - Movin On Up (Dirty Werk Remix) - Add. Production and Remix

P!nk ft. Cash Cash - Can We Pretend (Dirty Werk Remix) - Add. Production and Remix

Paula Cole - Hope Is Everywhere (Dirty Werk Remix) - Add. Production and Remix

Radmila - U R Moving Me (Dirty Werk Remix) - Add. Production and Remix

Hillary Roberts - Good Man (Dirty Werk Remix) - Add. Production and Remix
Lovari Adam Barta Electropoint -  No Day Like Today (Dirty Werk Remix) - Add. Production and Remix

Dirty Werk - No Letting Go - Wrote & Produced

Benny Mardones - Into The Night (Dirty Werk Remix) - Add. Production and Remix

Laverne Cox - Welcome Home (Dirty Werk Remix) - Add. Production and Remix

John Denver x Dirty Werk - Country Roads - Wrote & Produced

Ed Sheeran & Travis Scott - Antisocial (Steve Smooth Extended Remix) - Add. Production and Remix

Dave Matthias ft. Makeba - Madness And The Darkness (Dirty Werk Remix) - Add. Production and Remix

Temmora Featuring Karma - Fire (Dirty Werk Remix) - Add. Production and Remix

Martin Garrix - Summer Days (Dirty Werk Remix) - STMPD - Add. Production and Remix

Kendra Erika - A Deeper Love (Dirty Werk Remix) - Add. Production and Remix

Synes - Something’s Got To Give (Dirty Werk Remix) - Add. Production and Remix

P!nk - Walk Me Home (Dirty Werk Remix) - RCA - Add. Production and Remix

Going Home - DJ Kue (Dirty Werk Remix) - 418 Records - Add. Production and Remix

21 Savage - A&T (Steve Smooth Remix) - Add. Production and Remix

Kendra Erika - A Deeper Love (Dirty Werk Remix) - Add. Production and Remix

Omar Veluz - Send Me An Angel (Dirty Werk Remix) - Add. Production and Remix

Ariana Grande - Break Up With Your Girlfriend Im Bored (Dirty Werk Remix) - Rupublic Records - Add. Production and Remix

Rob Thomas - One Less Day (Dirty Werk Remix) - Atlantic Records - Add. Production and Remix

Ariana Grande - 7 Rings (Dirty Werk Remix) - Rupublic Records - Add. Production and Remix

Lil Pump - Be Like Me - (Steve Smooth Remix) - Add. Production and Remix

Diana Ross - The Boss 2109 (Dirty Werk Remix) - Motown Records - Add. Production and Remix

Velvet Code - Mary Offered Ladybugs And Love Yous (Dirty Werk Remix)

Mustard & Migos - Pure Water (Steve Smooth Remix) - Add. Production and Remix
 
Ray Guell - Don't Wanna Cry (Dirty Werk Remix) - Add. Production and Remix

C-Rod feat. Bredan O'Hara - Stay (Dirty Werk Remix) - Add. Production and Remix

Ariana Grande - thank u, next (Dirty Werk Remix) - Rupublic Records - Add. Production and Remix

Ariana Grande - Breathin (Dirty Werk Remix) - Rupublic Records - Add. Production and Remix

SEXTRONICA ft. Claudia Monet - Little Voices (Dirty Werk Remix)

Krys Monique - So Good (Dirty Werk Remix) 

Kendra Erika - Self Control (Dirty Werk Remix)

Peyton Shayler - Want Me To Love You (Dirty Werk Remix)

Janet Jackson x Daddy Yankee - Made For Now (Dirty Werk Remix)

Jena Rose - Lost At Sea (Dirty Werk Remix)

Hilary Roberts - There For You (Dirty Werk Remix)

Caroline Lund - When U Tell Me (Dirty Werk Remix)

The Rua - All I Ever Wanted (Dirty Werk Remix)

Dirty Werk, Steve Smooth & Bam Bam - Stand Up

Kygo ft. Miguel - Remind Me To Forget  (Dirty Werk Remix)

Sir Ivan - Get Together (Dirty Werk Remix)

JJ Thornhill - Take Me Back (Dirty Werk Remix)

Christine Gordon - Tidal Wave (Dirty Werk Remix)

Genesis Jones - With or Without You (Dirty Werk Remix)

Sophie Simmons - Black Mirror (Dirty Werk Remix) - Add. Production and Remix

Jena Rose - Reasons (Dirty Werk Remix) - Add. Production and Remix

Orion Starchild - Like My Status (Dirty Werk Remix) - Add. Production and Remix

Enrique Iglesias ft. Bad Bunny - El Baño (Dirty Werk Remix) - Sony - Add. Production and Remix

Perry Twins ft. Harper Starling - Euphoria (Dirty Werk Remix) - Add. Production and Remix

OBB - Mona Lisa (Dirty Werk Remix) - Curb Records - Add. Production and Remix

Dave Aude ft. King Brown - Perfect To Me (Dirty Werk Remix) - Audacious - Add. Production and Remix

Azure - Too Late (Dirty Werk Remix) - 2220 - Add. Production and Remix

LeAnn Rimes - Love Line (Dirty Werk Remix) - Sony Music - Add. Production and Remix

Richard Orlinski & Nyanda - On My Way (Dirty Werk Remix) - Play Two - Add. Production and Remix

AXSHN - Location - Atlantic - Wrote & Produced

Scotty Boy & Lizzie Curious - Shine Your Love (Dirty Werk Remix) - 418 - Add. Production and Remix

El General - Tu Pum Pum (Steve Smooth Remix) - Add. Production and Remix

Ricky Rebel - If You Were My Baby (Dirty Werk Remix) Audio4Play - Add. Production and Remix

Avicii feat. Rita Ora - Lonely Together (Dirty Werk Remix) - Add. Production and Remix

Yo Gotti & Mike WiLL Made-It - Rake It Up ft. Nicki Minaj (Steve Smooth & Tony Arzadon Remix) - Add. Production and Remix

AXSHN - Tell Me (Dirty Werk Remix) - Atlantic - Add. Production and Remix

AXSHN - Tell Me - Atlantic - Wrote & Produced

Kendra Erika - Under My Skin (Dirty Werk Remix) - Dauman Music - Add. Production and Remix

Brooke Candy - Living Out Loud feat. Sia (Dirty Werk Remix) - RCA - Add. Production and Remix

Kyle - iSpy (Steve Smooth & Tony Arzadon Remix) - Atlantic - Add. Production and Remix

Steve Smooth & Bam Bam - Spread Love - Fly House Records - Wrote & Produced

Lodato, Joseph Duveen & Jaclyn Walker - Breathe Again (Steve Smooth & Tony Arzadon Remix) - Add. Production and Remix

Nervo - In Your Arms (Kalendr & Steve Smooth Remix) - Big Beat - Add. Production and Remix

Kygo & Selena Gomez - It Ain't Me (Steve Smooth Remix) - Ultra Records - Add. Production and Remix

Steve Smooth & Tony Arzadon - Turn Up The Bass - Menage Music - Wrote & Produced

Bebe Rexha - I Got You (Dirty Werk Remix) - Warner Bros - Add. Production and Remix

Ed Sheeran - Shape Of You (Tony Arzadon & Steve Smooth Remix) - Atlantic - Add. Production and Remix

Kendra Erika - Oasis (Dirty Werk Remix) - Dauman Music - Add. Production and Remix

Steve Smooth - Here We Go - Menage Music - Wrote & Produced

Steve Smooth - Gotta Love - Menage Music - Wrote & Produced

Skrillex & Rick Ross - Purple Lamborghini (Tony Arzadon & Steve Smooth Remix) - Atlantic - Add. Production and Remix

Tony Arzadon & Steve Smooth - Bang! - Menage Music - Wrote & Produced

Twenty One Pilots - Ride (Steve Smooth & Tony Arzadon Remix) - Fueled By Ramen - Add. Production and Remix

Steve Smooth & Tony Arzadon - Oh! Bring It Baby - Menage Music - Wrote & Produced

Steve Smooth - Body 2 Body - Menage Music - Wrote & Produced

Steve Smooth - No Good - Menage Music - Wrote & Produced

Steve Smooth feat. Jenny G - Lose Control - Menage Music – Wrote & Produced

Steve Smooth - Bring That Beat Back - Menage Music – Wrote & Produced

Steve Smooth - Pump Up The Volume - Menage Music – Wrote & Produced

Bad Boy Bill & Steve Smooth feat. Seann Bowe - Feel Alive – Menage Music – Wrote & Produced

John Newman - Love Me Again (Bad Boy Bill & Steve Smooth Remix) - Island – Add. Production and Remix

Bad Boy Bill & Steve Smooth - Get On The Floor - Menage Music – Wrote & Produced

Bad Boy Bill & Steve Smooth - Mmm Drop - Menage Music – Wrote & Produced

George Acosta & Ben Hague - Time Stood Still (Steve Smooth, Sephano & Torio Remix) - Black Hole Recordings – Add. Production and Remix

Bad Boy Bill & Steve Smooth feat. Seann Bowe - Free - Menage Music – Wrote & Produced

Scotty Boy & DJ Red feat. Ajay Popoff - Know Your Name Tonight (Steve Smooth, Sephano & Torio Remix) - Flamingo Recordings – Add. Production and Remix

Dragon & Jontron feat. Lea Luna - Tonight (Steve Smooth & Tony Arzadon Remix) - Black Hole Recordings – Add. Production and Remix

Steve Smooth, Sephano & Torio feat. Little Lisa - All Your Love - Menage Music – Wrote & Produced

Steve Smooth & JJ Flores feat. Colette - Stay (Sephano & Torio 2013 Remix) - Ultra Records / Menage Music – Wrote & Produced

Steve Smooth, Sephano & Torio feat. Jenny G - This Is The Night - Black Hole Recordings – Wrote & Produced

Steve Smooth & Tony Arzadon feat. Tamra Keenan - All You and I - Black Hole Recordings – Wrote & Produced

Steve Smooth, Joey C & Dj Torio feat. Drew Delneky - Be Without You - Ultra Records – Wrote & Produced

Steve Smooth with Tamra Keenan - Stalker - Ultra Records – Wrote & Produced

Steve Smooth, Kalendr & Jonas Tempel - The Maya - Ultra Records – Wrote & Produced

Steve Smooth & Kalendr - Dancin with the Dead - Ultra Records – Wrote & Produced

Steve Smooth feat. Tamra Keenan - You Take Me Here - Ultra Records / Menage Music – Wrote & Produced

Steve Smooth feat. Krystal Malik - I’m Not Sorry - Ultra Records / Menage Music – Wrote & Produced

Aaron Smith feat. Luvli - Dancin 2011 - Menage Music – Add. Production and Remix

Steve Smooth - Party People - Ultra Records / Menage Music – Wrote & Produced

Bad Boy Bill feat. Eric Jag - Got That Feeling - Nettwerk – Add. Production and Remix

Steve Smooth feat. Delano - Just Come With Me - Ultra Records / Menage Music – Wrote & Produced

Steve Smooth feat. Alex Peace - Make Some Noise - Ultra Records / Menage Music – Wrote & Produced

Steve Smooth feat. Luvli - So High - Ultra Records / Menage Music – Wrote & Produced

Bad Boy Bill feat. Alyssa Palmer - Do What U Like - Nettwerk – Co-Wrote & Co-Produced

Bad Boy Bill feat. Alyssa Palmer - Falling Anthem - Nettwerk – Co-Wrote & Co-Produced

JJ Flores & Steve Smooth feat. Alex Peace - Sex Fiend - Ultra Records / Menage Music – Wrote & Produced

JJ Flores & Steve Smooth feat. Colette - Stay - Ultra Records / Menage Music – Wrote & Produced

Ask (JJ Flores & Steve Smooth vs JES Mix) - Ultra Records – Wrote & Produced

JJ Flores & Steve Smooth feat. Alex Peace - I’m The 1 U C! - Ultra Records – Wrote & Produced

JJ Flores & Steve Smooth feat. B. Lee - Make It Up 2 U - Ultra Records – Wrote & Produced

JJ Flores & Steve Smooth feat. Alex Peace - Music Maker - Ultra Records – Wrote & Produced

JJ Flores & Steve Smooth feat. Little Lisa - Take Me - Ultra Records – Wrote & Produced

JJ Flores & Steve Smooth feat. Delano - Walking Away - Ultra Records – Wrote & Produced

JJ Flores & Steve Smooth and DJ Roland Clark - Peace & Happiness - Ultra Records / Menage Music – Wrote & Produced

JJ Flores & Steve Smooth Feat. B. Lee - Let It Go - Ultra Records / Menage Music – Wrote & Produced

The Young Punx - You’ve Got To... - Ultra Records – Add. Production and Remix

Nick Terranova - Come Alive - Ultra Records – Add. Production and Remix

JJ Flores & Steve Smooth Feat. Luvli - Being In Love - Ultra Records / Menage Music – Wrote & Produced

Santana Feat. Chad Kroeger - Into The Night - Arista – Add. Production and Remix

Shock Stars - Feel For A Heartbeat [EP] - Shock Stars Music – Wrote & Produced

Shock Stars - Shock Stars [EP] - Shock Stars Music – Wrote & Produced

Shock Stars - End Of Chicago – Menage Music – Wrote & Produced

Nelly Furtado - Say It Right - Geffen – Add. Production and Remix

JJ Flores & Steve Smooth - Deep Inside These Walls - Menage Music – Wrote & Produced

Starkillers Present Nick Terranova - Scream - Spinnin – Add. Production and Remix

Hatiras & DJ Dan - Love For The Weekend - Blow Media – Add. Production and Remix

JJ Flores & Steve Smooth Feat. Delano - Let Me Live - Menage Music – Wrote & Produced

Tom Novy - Your Body - Data – Add. Production and Remix

Mr. Groove - I Don’t Know - 24Seven – Add. Production and Remix

JJ Flores & Steve Smooth - Time For Love - Menage Music – Wrote & Produced

JJ Flores Feat. Delano - Feels So Good - Menage Music – Add. Production and Remix

JJ Flores & Steve Smooth - The Ride - Fine Tune Records – Wrote & Produced

Aaron Smith feat. Luvli - Dancin - Spinnin’ Records – Add. Production and Remix

JJ Flores & Steve Smooth - Freak You - International House Records – Wrote & Produced

Smooth & J feat. Alex Peace - B Like Me - Motus Music – Wrote & Produced

Dukes Of Sluca - Don’t Stop - Fine-Tune Records – Add. Production and Remix

Norty Cotto - I’ll Be Your Freak - Definitive – Add. Production and Remix

Patrick Alavi - 1992 - International House Records – Add. Production and Remix

David Garcia - Take U There - International House Records – Add. Production and Remix

Bad Boy Bill - Freq’d - International House Records – Add. Production

JJ Flores & Steve Smooth feat. Alex Peace - Discoteca - Moody Recordings – Wrote & Produced

Harrison Crump - The Talk 2 - Hump Records – Add. Production and Remix

Smooth & J - Get Naked - Motus Music – Wrote & Produced

J Flores & Steve Smooth feat. Delano - Release - International House Records – Wrote & Produced

Bad Boy Bill - Happy - Moody Recordings – Add. Production and Remix

Steve Smooth - Beat Freaker - International House Records – Wrote & Produced

Steve Smooth - Drop It - International House Records – Wrote & Produced

Bad Boy Bill - Costa Del Sol - Moody Recordings – Add. Production and Remix

Bad Boy Bill - Everybody - International House Records – Add. Production

Bad Boy Bill - Re-Conditioned - International House Records – Add. Production

Dajae - Everyday Of My Life - Kid Dynamite Records – Add. Production and Remix

Automatic - Gimme Your Love - International House Records – Add. Production and Remix

Dajae - Time - Kid Dynamite Records – Add. Production and Remix

Continuous DJ Mixes 
MADE In CHICAGO – JJ Flores & Steve Smooth -
Ultra Records – Produced & Mixed

Behind The Decks Live – Bad Boy Bill -
Thrive – Add. Production and Assistance

Behind The Decks – Bad Boy Bill -
System Recordings – Add. Production and Assistance

Bangin The Box 5 – Bad Boy Bill -
Mix Connection – Add. Production and Assistance

Bangin In London – Bad Boy Bill -
Master Dance Tones – Add. Production and Assistance

Discographies
Steve Smooth at AllMusic
Steve Smooth at Discogs

See also 
 Ultra Records

Notes 

"Release" JJ Flores & Steve Smooth feat. Delano was the 1st song ever sold on Beatport.com.

Awards and nominations

References

External links 
SteveSmooth.com
Steve Smooth on SoundCloud
Steve Smooth on YouTube
Steve Smooth on Facebook

1985 births
Club DJs
American DJs
American electronic musicians
Electro house musicians
Living people
Electronic dance music DJs